Ridgewell is a village and civil parish in the Braintree district of Essex, England, about six miles from Haverhill on the main road between Haverhill and Braintree.

Its population was 503 in 216 households in the 2001 census, with mean age 41.35 years, the population increasing to 509 at the 2011 Census.
It was mentioned in the Domesday Book.

Ridgewell has a village shop, primary school and two pubs: the White Horse and the King's Head. St Laurence's Church dates from the 14th century and is a grade I listed building.

The church has a ring of 6 bells. https://dove.cccbr.org.uk/detail.php?tower=16172

RAF Ridgewell was the base for the USAAF 381st Bomb Group (H) and No. 90 Squadron RAF, part of No. 3 (Bomber) Group, during the Second World War.

References

External links

Villages in Essex
Braintree District